The Grand Palais Éphémère is a temporary exhibition hall in the Champ de Mars by architect Jean-Michel Wilmotte. The 10,000 m2 hall is expected to be completed in 2021 and dismantled in 2024. Its purpose is to host exhibitions while the Grand Palais is being renovated for the 2024 Summer Olympics. The Grand Palais Éphémère will host the Judo events at the 2024 Summer Olympics.
GL events, the events organisation major, is the concessionaire for the ephemeral Grand Palais. It maintains and manages the resale of the building.

In July 2021, it hosted the 10th edition of the forum for timber engineers and architects at the International Forum Bois of Construction.

References 

Grand Palais
Buildings and structures in the 7th arrondissement of Paris
Monuments and memorials in Paris
Event venues established in 2021
Museums in Paris
Venues of the 2024 Summer Olympics
Olympic judo venues
Olympic wrestling venues
2021 establishments in France
21st-century architecture in France